Kilfinnane or Kilfinane ( or) is a small market town in County Limerick, Ireland. Kilfinnane is located approximately 40 km southeast of Limerick, and approximately 70 km north-northwest of Cork. It had a population of 789 at the 2016 census.

It is surrounded on three sides by the Ballyhoura Mountains, and on the fourth side is the "Golden Vale" region that runs through Counties Limerick, Cork, and Tipperary.

In 2014, Kilfinnane hosted the inaugural "HearSay International Audio Festival", an event focusing on creative audio. The second HearSay Festival was held in November 2015 had over 80 workshops, installations and performances.

Education

Kilfinnane facilitates both Primary and Secondary Education.

Kilfinnane Primary School Scoil Fhíonáin is located very close to the Secondary School and has a new building opened in September 2012. Prior to this, the Primary School was located in an old former Catholic residence, which was notorious due to reports of infestation, cold conditions and outdoor toilets. In November 2012, disputes amongst building subcontractors and the main building contractor of the new School resulted in builders cutting the power and water, and removing the fittings of the newly opened school building. Parents created a blockade to prevent the builders from leaving the school grounds. The standoff became a national news story. An RTÉ Radio 1 radio documentary "Take No More" by Grey Heron Media on the standoff won Gold at the 2013 PPI Radio Awards, the 2013 Association for International Broadcasting, and the 2013 New York Radio Festival.

Scoil Pól Kilfinnane was founded in 1915 and made its current home in 1987. The school, a Catholic school, offers a range of educational and extra-curricular activities. Some of its activities include sports, cairdeas, transition year activities, green flag and chess.

Notable people

 Patrick Wallace (aka Staker Wallace) (18th century United Irishman) 
 Gabriel Rosenstock, Irish writer and poet.
 Peter McDonald, Member of Parliament for North Sligo, 1885 - 1891.
 Sean 'Óg' Hanley who won All Ireland Medals with Limerick, in 1897, and London, in 1901 was a native of Kilfinnane. The 1897 team was spearheaded by Kilfinnane players, who were Co Champions the previous year 
 Richie McCarthy, Limerick Hurler and 2013 All-Star
 James Heffernan, member of 24th Seanad Éireann, the upper house of the Oireachtas (legislature) of the Republic of Ireland.
James Murphy, 19th century judge of the High Court.

See also
 List of towns in the Republic of Ireland
 Market Houses in the Republic of Ireland

Notes

Towns and villages in County Limerick